Diabolical Figures is the seventh studio album by the symphonic black metal band Graveworm. It was released on 16 June 2009 through Massacre Records. The album was recorded at Stage One studios in Borgentreich, Germany with producer Andy Classen, and features a guest appearance by Karsten "Jagger" Jäger from Disbelief.

Track listing

Personnel
Stefan Fiori - Vocals
Eric Righi - Guitar
Thomas Orgler - Guitar
Sabine Mair - Keyboard
Harry Klenk -  Bass
Martin Innerbichler - Drums

References

2009 albums
Graveworm albums
Massacre Records albums
Albums produced by Andy Classen